Local elections was held in the province of Batangas on May 10, 2010, as part of the 2010 general election.  Voters will select candidates for all local positions: a town mayor, vice mayor and town councilors, as well as members of the Sangguniang Panlalawigan, the vice-governor, governor and representatives for the four districts of Batangas. The list below are the candidates as of May 2010.

Gubernatorial election 

Vilma Santos Recto was the incumbent. Her opponent was former Governor Armondo Sanchez. Sanchez suffered a stroke due to fatigue while campaigning and died on April 27. His wife, Santo Tomas Mayor Edna Sanchez, was his substitute.

Notes
 A^ Arman Sanchez died of hypertension on April 27, 2010. His wife, incumbent Santo Tomas mayor Edna Sanchez, was named as his substitute.
 B^ Ermita is Sanchez's guest candidate.

Congressional elections 

Each of Batangas's four legislative districts will elect each representative to the House of Representatives.

1st District
Incumbent Eileen Ermita-Buhain is in her third consecutive term and is ineligible to run; her father Eduardo is her party's nominee for the seat.

Eduardo Ermita placed the result of the election under protest in the House of Representatives Electoral Tribunal.

2nd District
Hermilando Mandanas is the incumbent.

3rd District
Victoria Hernandez-Reyes is in her third consecutive term and is ineligible to run; her husband Rodrigo is her party's nominee for the seat.

The result of the election is under protest in the House of Representatives Electoral Tribunal.

4th District
Mark L. Mendoza is the incumbent.

Sangguniang Panlalawigan elections
All 4 Districts of Batangas will elect Sangguniang Panlalawigan or provincial board members.

Summary

1st District
Municipality: Balayan, Calaca, Calatagan, Lemery, Lian, Catigbian, Taal, Tuy, Nasugbu
Population (2007):  522,607
Parties are as stated in their certificate of candidacies.

|-
|colspan=5 bgcolor=black|

|-

2nd District
City: Batangas City
Municipality: Bauan, Lobo, Mabini, San Luis, San Pascual, Tuy
Population (2007):  558,882
Parties are as stated in their certificate of candidacies.

|-
|colspan=5 bgcolor=black|

|-

3rd District
City: Tanauan City
Municipality: Agoncillo, Alitagtag, Balete, Cuenca, Laurel, Malvar, Mataas na Kahoy, San Nicolas, Santa Teresita, Santo Tomas, Talisay
Population (2007):  537,399
Parties are as stated in their certificate of candidacies

|-
|colspan=5 bgcolor=black|

|-

4th District
City: Lipa City
Municipality: Ibaan, Padre Garcia, Rosario, San Jose, San Juan, Taysan
Population (2007):  626,981
Parties are as stated in their certificate of candidacies

|-
|colspan=5 bgcolor=black|

|-

Mayoralty elections
All municipalities of Batangas, Batangas City, Lipa City and Tanauan City will elect mayor and vice-mayor this election. The candidates for mayor and vice mayor with the highest number of votes wins the seat; they are voted separately, therefore, they may be of different parties when elected. Below is the list of mayoralty candidates of each city and municipalities per district.

1st District, Candidates for Mayor
Municipality: Balayan, Calaca, Calatagan, Lemery, Lian, Nasugbu, Taal, Tuy

Balayan

Calaca

Calatagan

Lemery

Lian

Nasugbu

Taal

Tuy

2nd District, Candidates for Mayor
City: Batangas City
Municipality: Bauan, Lobo, Mabini, San Luis, San Pascual, Tingloy

Batangas City

Bauan

Lobo

Mabini

San Luis

<

San Pascual

Tingloy

3rd District, Candidates for Mayor
City: Tanauan City
Municipality: Agoncillo, Alitagtag, Balete, Cuenca, Laurel, Malvar, Mataas na Kahoy, Batangas, San Nicolas, Santa Teresita, Santo Tomas, Talisay

Tanauan City

<

Agoncillo

<

Alitagtag

<

Balete

<

Cuenca

<

Laurel

Nacionalista hold
<

Malvar

<

Mataas na Kahoy

<

San Nicolas

<

Santa Teresita

<

Santo Tomas

<

Notes
 A^ Renato Federico substituted Edna Sanchez, who was named as the substitute gubernatorial candidate to her husband Arman Sanchez who died on April 27, 2010.

Talisay

<

4th District, Candidates for Mayor
City: Lipa City
Municipality: Ibaan, Padre Garcia, Rosario, San Jose, San Juan, Taysan

Lipa City

<

Ibaan

<

Padre Garcia

<

Rosario

<

San Jose

<

San Juan

Taysan

<

Footnotes 

2010 Philippine local elections
Elections in Batangas
2010 elections in Calabarzon